Foot Fetish is the first solo studio album by the Jackyl singer Jesse James Dupree, released in 2000.

"Mainline" peaked at No. 34 on the Billboard Mainstream Rock chart.

Critical reception
AllMusic wrote that "songs such as the album-opening 'Mainline' and 'Losing My Mind' would've sounded splendid on Headbanger's Ball circa 1989." The Lincoln Journal Star thought that the album "finds a more musically mature, but still hard-rocking, Dupree playing a batch of songs he wrote for himself and not the band." The Times & Transcript called it a "cheesened lump of boozey bluesy riff-raffling mucho-macho metal pop drivel." The Daily Post stated that "the driving, unbridled strength of Dupree's music is not only catchy, but also rather addictive."

Track listing 
All songs written by Jesse James Dupree except where noted.
 "Mainline" – 3:25 (Dupree/Wyzard)
 "First Taste of Freedom" – 3:53
 "Losing My Mind" – 3:39 (Dupree/Roman Glick)
 "Second Chance" – 3:09
 "Satisfied" – 2:56 (Dupree/D. Murdock)
 "Devil's Advocate" – 4:31
 "Reason" – 4:31 (Dupree/Joey Huffman)
 "I Gotcha" – 3:04 (Joe Tex)
 "I Don't Share Your Pain" – 4:05
 "Let's Don't Go There" – 3:46 (Dupree/John Hayes)
 "There Comes a Time" – 4:59 (Dupree/Hayes)
 "Higher" – 3:47 (Sylvester Stewart)
Track 8 originally recorded by Joe Tex
Track 12 originally recorded by Sly & the Family Stone on the album Dance to the Music.

Personnel
Jesse James Dupree – vocals, guitars and percussion
John Hayes – guitar
Roman Glick – bass guitar (2-4 & 6)
Ivo Severijns – bass guitar (Tracks 1, 5 & 7-12)
Tony Belser – drums
Joey Huffman – keyboards

Production
Mixing – Mike Fraser
Engineer – Jesse James Dupree, Don Tart and Mike Fraser

References

Jesse James Dupree albums
2000 debut albums